

The Levasseur PL.15 was a torpedo bomber seaplane developed in France in the early 1930s. It was a follow-on design to Levasseur's PL.14 that had, in turn, been developed from the carrier-based PL.7. While the PL.14 retained the PL.7's boat-like fuselage (developed as a safety feature for carrier-based aircraft ditching), the PL.15 was a purpose-built seaplane with an all-new, slender fuselage.

The Aéronavale ordered 16 PL.15s for use aboard the seaplane tender Commandant Teste, and purchased and deployed the prototype as well. These were in service from 1933 to 1938, when they were put into storage. The PL.15s were reactivated with the outbreak of war in September 1939, and were used for anti-submarine patrol along France's Atlantic coast.

Variants
 PL.15 – main production version (17 built)
 PL.151 – radical inverted sesquiplane redesign with full-size mid-wing mainplane and small secondary plane mounted above fuselage (not built)
 PL.154 – landplane version (1 converted from PL.15)

Units using this aircraft

 Aéronavale
 Escadrille 7B2
 Escadrille 3S6

Specifications

See also

References

Notes

Bibliography

 Taylor, John W. R. and Jean Alexander. Combat Aircraft of the World. New York: G.P. Putnam's Sons, 1969. .  
 Taylor, Michael J. H. Jane's Encyclopedia of Aviation. London: Studio Editions, 1989. . 
 World Aircraft Information Files. London: Bright Star Publishing.

External links

 aviafrance.com

1930s French bomber aircraft
Floatplanes
Levasseur aircraft
Biplanes
Single-engined tractor aircraft
Aircraft first flown in 1932